"Born of Frustration" is a song written by Jim Glennie, Larry Gott, and Tim Booth and released as a single by English Madchester band James. It is the follow-up to 1991 hits "Sit Down" and "Sound", which both peaked within the UK top 10.

The song was released from the group's fourth album, Seven (1992), and reached number 13 in the United Kingdom. It was also a hit on US alternative radio, peaking at number five on the Billboard Modern Rock Tracks chart. It was the group's highest chart placement on that chart until "Laid" made it to number three the following year.

Track listings

UK 7-inch and cassette single
 "Born of Frustration"
 "Be My Prayer"

UK CD and 12-inch single
 "Born of Frustration"
 "Be My Prayer"
 "Sound" ('Diceman' mix)

Japanese mini-CD single
 "Born of Frustration"
 "Sit Down" (live)

Charts

References

1992 singles
1992 songs
Fontana Records singles
James (band) songs